The Theremin Center for Electroacoustic Music was created in Moscow, Russia in 1992 by the group of musicians and computer scientists, under the leadership of Andrey Smirnov. It was named for Leon Theremin - Russian inventor of the Theremin, one of the first widely used electronic musical instruments.

The Theremin Center aims to achieve a co-operation of musicians, artists, scientists, and technologists who are oriented toward realization of experimental artistic projects. The centre is envisioned as a base from which to carry out interdisciplinary research in such fields as computer music, electroacoustic music, interactive systems, multimedia, including dance, visual arts etc., as well as a centre for the development and creation of innovative programs, technical devices and techniques. 

From the start the Theremin Center was intended to operate on a non-profit basis and most services and equipment were donated by the founders and sponsors of the Theremin Center. Professor Jon Appleton founded the International Advisory Board and helped in developing the Theremin Center and establishing continuous relationships within the international musical and scientific communities. The Moscow State Conservatory has provided space. It was a part of the Sound Recording and Musical Acoustics Laboratory - the place where in the 1960s Leon Theremin was conducting his research. Since 2005, the Theremin Center has been a part of the Electroacoustic Center at Moscow State Conservatory.

See also 
 Teen Age Message#Theremin concert by Theremin Center performers Lydia Kavina, Yana Aksenova, and Anton Kerchenko for a series of interstellar radio transmissions sent to six star systems in 2001

External links
 http://theremin.ru

Music education organizations
Theremins
Music organizations based in Russia